The Tommykaira ZZII was a Japanese mid-engined sports car engineered and developed by Tommykaira in 2001. Designed by Noriyuki Nishida, the ZZII was intended to be the bigger and faster version of the ZZ, but it failed to enter production and remained in the prototype stage. Vehicle retailer Autobacs Seven bought the design shortly after it was shown and tried to market the car as the Garaiya RS01 (or simply the RS01).

Fate and potential revival 
After its unveiling at the 2002 Tokyo Auto Salon, Tommykaira promised to sell the car in high volumes, with the company already having an organized delivery schedule after the show. Shortly after its unveiling, however, the design was bought out by Autobacs Seven, and later renamed the car to ASL RS01. It also remained in prototype condition, which meant the car did not get into production. In early 2022, Tomita announced he was working on setting a limited production run of ZZIIs, but no further information has been disclosed. To promote the car and the revived brand, the ZZII will be placed in a showroom in Kyoto.

Specifications and design 
The car is powered by a 2.7-liter twin-turbocharged RB26DETT I6 engine sourced from Nissan delivering  at 5,900 rpm. The car was intended to weigh , mostly thanks to its ZZ-derived aluminium chassis and full carbon fiber bodywork. The frame is of the same type of the ZZ - square section extruded aluminium tub, with steel subframes - but the tub was shaped as an oval instead of an arrow, by curving the walls, so the seats didn't have to be pointed inwards. The subframes were designed as crumple zones too, so that the car could be crash homologated. The design is aerodynamic and intended for lower drag coefficients and better airflow. The two distinctive roof dynamic air intakes come to shape a large NACA duct on the rear window, intended to collect more air into the intercooler.
The power is delivered to all four wheels by a 6-speed Getrag manual transmission derived from the tenth-generation Skyline GT-R together with the ATTESA ET-S system, also making the car all-wheel drive. A custom transfer case had to be designed to allow for different diameter wheels front to rear. Autobacs estimated it to weigh , due to the all-wheel drive system and to the bodywork of the prototype being made of fiberglass.

In popular media 
The ZZII was a regular addition to the Gran Turismo video game series since Gran Turismo 2. It last appeared in Gran Turismo 6.

This car has a more serious look and has an appearance that is similar to that of a GT1 race car, as it was intended to be a true road going racecar. Soon afterwards, the concept was turned into a GT-style car with AWD and a more gentle power delivery. The car featured in Gran Turismo 3: A-Spec and later games is based on this concept design.

The definitive design of the car was only featured in the GT Pro Series. The Gran Turismo games from Gran Turismo 5 and Gran Turismo 6 never saw their polygonal models updated since it was first added in Gran Turismo 3: A-Spec and after the car was finished.

References 

Cars of Japan
Sports cars
Concept cars
Rear mid-engine, all-wheel-drive vehicles